The 1999 Toyota Princess Cup was a women's tennis tournament played on outdoor hard courts in Tokyo, Japan. It was part of Tier II of the 1999 WTA Tour. It was the third edition of the tournament and was held from 20 September through 27 September 1999. First-seeded Lindsay Davenport won the singles title and earned $80,000 first-prize money.

Entrants

Seeds

Other entrants
The following players received wildcards into the singles main draw:
  Monique Viele
  Miho Saeki

The following players received wildcards into the doubles main draw:
  Tara Snyder /  Monique Viele

The following players received entry from the singles qualifying draw:

  Shinobu Asagoe
  Vanessa Webb
  Yuka Yoshida
  Miroslava Vavrinec

The following players received entry as lucky losers:
  Tracy Singian
  Park Sung-hee

The following players received entry from the doubles qualifying draw:

  Haruka Inoue /  Maiko Inoue

Finals

Singles

 Lindsay Davenport defeated  Monica Seles, 7–5, 7–6(7–1)
 This was Davenport's fifth singles title of the year and the 24th of her career.

Doubles

 Conchita Martínez /  Patricia Tarabini defeated  Amanda Coetzer /  Jelena Dokić, 6–7(7–9), 6–4, 6–2

References

External links
 ITF tournament edition details
 Tournament draws

Toyota Princess Cup
Toyota Princess Cup
1999 in Japanese tennis
1999 in Japanese women's sport